Mandi Burewala railway station is  located in  Pakistan.

See also
 List of railway stations in Pakistan
 Pakistan Railways

References

External links

Railway stations in Vehari District
Railway stations on Lodhran–Raiwind Line